This is a list of National Basketball Association players whose last names begin with H.

The list also includes players from the American National Basketball League (NBL), the Basketball Association of America (BAA), and the original American Basketball Association (ABA). All of these leagues contributed to the formation of the present-day NBA.

Individuals who played in the NBL prior to its 1949 merger with the BAA are listed in italics, as they are not traditionally listed in the NBA's official player registers.

H

Ha Seung-Jin
Bill Haarlow
Rui Hachimura
Rudy Hackett
Hamed Haddadi
Jim Hadnot
Scott Haffner
Cliff Hagan
Glenn Hagan
Tom Hagan
Ashton Hagans
Bob Hahn
George Haines
Warren Hair
Al Hairston
Happy Hairston
Lindsay Hairston
Malik Hairston
P. J. Hairston
Marcus Haislip
Chick Halbert
Swede Halbrook
Bruce Hale
Hal Hale
Jack Haley
Tyrese Haliburton
Shaler Halimon
Devon Hall
Donta Hall
Jordan Hall
Josh Hall
Mike Hall
Tyler Hall
Jeff Halliburton
Darvin Ham
Ray Hamann
Steve Hamer
Dale Hamilton
Daniel Hamilton
Dennis Hamilton
Joe Hamilton
Jordan Hamilton
Justin Hamilton
Ralph Hamilton
Richard Hamilton
Roy Hamilton
Steve Hamilton
Tang Hamilton
Thomas Hamilton
Zendon Hamilton
Geert Hammink
Julian Hammond
Tom Hammonds
A. J. Hammons
Joe Hamood
R. J. Hampton
Darrin Hancock
Ben Handlogten
Cecil Hankins
Phil Hankinson
Dusty Hannahs
Alex Hannum
Don Hanrahan
Rollen Hans
Ben Hansbrough
Tyler Hansbrough
Bob Hansen
Glenn Hansen
Lars Hansen
Travis Hansen
Reggie Hanson
Bill Hanzlik
Bill Hapac
Luke Harangody
Penny Hardaway
Tim Hardaway
Tim Hardaway Jr.
James Harden
Reggie Harding
Charles Hardnett
Alan Hardy
Darrell Hardy
Jaden Hardy
James Hardy
Ira Harge
John Hargis
Maurice Harkless
Jerry Harkness
Skip Harlicka
Jerome Harmon
Derek Harper
Jared Harper
Justin Harper
Mike Harper
Ron Harper
Ron Harper Jr.
Matt Harpring
Montrezl Harrell
Josh Harrellson
Adam Harrington
Al Harrington
Lorinza Harrington
Othella Harrington
Art Harris
Bernie Harris
Billy Harris
Bob Harris
Chris Harris
Devin Harris
Elias Harris
Gary Harris
Jalen Harris
Joe Harris
Kevon Harris
Lucious Harris
Luther Harris
Manny Harris
Mike Harris
Steve Harris
Terrel Harris
Tobias Harris
Tony Harris
Aaron Harrison
Andrew Harrison
Bob Harrison
David Harrison
Shaquille Harrison
Jason Hart
Josh Hart
Isaiah Hartenstein
Huck Hartman
Antonio Harvey
Don Harvey
Donnell Harvey
Nick Hashu
Scott Haskin
Clem Haskins
Udonis Haslem
Trenton Hassell
Billy Hassett
Joe Hassett
Bob Hassmiller
Scott Hastings
Kirk Haston
Vernon Hatton
Sam Hauser
John Havlicek
Spencer Hawes
Steve Hawes
Connie Hawkins
Earl Hawkins
Hersey Hawkins
Juaquin Hawkins
Marshall Hawkins
Michael Hawkins
Robert Hawkins
Tom Hawkins
Chuck Hawley
Nate Hawthorne
Chuck Hayes
Elvin Hayes
Jarvis Hayes
Jaxson Hayes
Jim Hayes
Killian Hayes
Nigel Hayes
Ray Hayes
Steve Hayes
Gordon Hayward
Lazar Hayward
Brendan Haywood
Spencer Haywood
John Hazen
Walt Hazzard
Luther Head
Shane Heal
Brian Heaney
Gar Heard
Reggie Hearn
Pete Hecomovich
Herm Hedderick
Alvin Heggs
Tom Heinsohn
Dickie Hemric
Alan Henderson
Cedric Henderson (b. 1965)
Cedric Henderson (b. 1975)
Curt Henderson
David Henderson
Gerald Henderson
Gerald Henderson Jr.
J. R. Henderson
Jerome Henderson
Kevin Henderson
Tom Henderson
Mark Hendrickson
Larry Hennessy
Don Henriksen
Aaron Henry
Al Henry
Bill Henry
Carl Henry
Conner Henry
Myke Henry
Skeeter Henry
Xavier Henry
Bob Henshaw
John Henson
Steve Henson
Charlie Hentz
Paul Herman
Bill Herman
Kleggie Hermsen
Dewan Hernandez
Juan Hernangómez
Willy Hernangómez
Chris Herren
Carl Herrera
Walter Herrmann
Tyler Herro
Keith Herron
Sidney Hertzberg
Kevin Hervey
George Hesik
Dan Hester
Fred Hetzel
Bill Hewitt
Jack Hewson
Art Heyman
Mario Hezonja
Roy Hibbert
Nat Hickey
Isaiah Hicks
Phil Hicks
JJ Hickson
Buddy Hield
Bill Higgins
Cory Higgins
Earle Higgins
Jim Higgins
Mike Higgins
Rod Higgins
Sean Higgins
Kenny Higgs
Johnny High
Haywood Highsmith
Wayne Hightower
Jim Hilgemann
Armond Hill
Cleo Hill
Gary Hill
George Hill
Grant Hill
Jordan Hill
Malcolm Hill
Mort Hill
Simmie Hill
Solomon Hill
Steven Hill
Tyrone Hill
Darrun Hilliard
Art Hillhouse
Darnell Hillman
Fred Hilton
Kirk Hinrich
Roy Hinson
Nate Hinton
Pat Hintz
Mel Hirsch
Lew Hitch
Robert Hite
Joel Hitt
Jaylen Hoard
Darington Hobson
Donald Hodge
Julius Hodge
Craig Hodges
Charlie Hoefer
Johnny Hoekstra
Howie Hoffman
Paul Hoffman
George Hogan
Bob Hogsett
Paul Hogue
Fred Hoiberg
Doug Holcomb
Randy Holcomb
Aaron Holiday
Jrue Holiday
Justin Holiday
Bill Holland
Brad Holland
Joe Holland
John Holland
Wilbur Holland
Lionel Hollins
Ryan Hollins
Essie Hollis
Rondae Hollis-Jefferson
Bobby Holm
Denny Holman
Ife Holmes
Richaun Holmes
Jim Holstein
A. W. Holt
Michael Holton
Dick Holub
Joe Holup
Red Holzman
Jim Homer
Jerald Honeycutt
Tyler Honeycutt
Derek Hood
Rodney Hood
Bobby Hooper
Carroll Hooser
Tom Hoover
Bob Hopkins
Dave Hoppen
Dennis Hopson
Scotty Hopson
Johnny Horan
Cedrick Hordges
Al Horford
Tito Horford
Ron Horn
Jeff Hornacek
Dennis Horner
Robert Horry
Ed Horton
Talen Horton-Tucker
Bill Hosket Jr.
Bill Hosket Sr.
Bob Houbregs
Danuel House
Eddie House
Caleb Houstan
Allan Houston
Byron Houston
Tom Hovasse
Brian Howard
Dwight Howard
Greg Howard
Josh Howard
Juwan Howard
Markus Howard
Mo Howard
Otis Howard
Stephen Howard
William Howard
Bailey Howell
Bob Hubbard
Phil Hubbard
Lee Huber
Trevor Hudgins
Lester Hudson
Lou Hudson
Roosie Hudson
Troy Hudson
Marcelo Huertas
Kevin Huerter
Josh Huestis
Jay Huff
Marv Huffman
Nate Huffman
Vern Huffman
Alfredrick Hughes
Eddie Hughes
Elijah Hughes
Kim Hughes
Larry Hughes
Rick Hughes
Harold Hull
Robbie Hummel
John Hummer
Ryan Humphrey
Isaac Humphries
Jay Humphries
Kris Humphries
Hot Rod Hundley
Feron Hunt
Brandon Hunter
Cedric Hunter
Chris Hunter
De'Andre Hunter
Les Hunter
Lindsey Hunter
Othello Hunter
R. J. Hunter
Steven Hunter
Vince Hunter
Bobby Hurley
Roy Hurley
Geoff Huston
Paul Huston
Hal Hutcheson
Dar Hutchins
Mel Hutchins
Chandler Hutchison
Herbie Hutchisson
Joe Hutton
Art Hyatt
Greg Hyder
Bones Hyland

References
  NBA & ABA Players with Last Names Starting with H @ basketball-reference.com
 NBL Players with Last Names Starting with H @ basketball-reference.com

H